Mount Fromme is a  mountain summit located within Olympic National Park in Jefferson County of Washington state. It is situated at the head of Dosewallips River, within the Daniel J. Evans Wilderness. The nearest higher neighbor is Mount Claywood,  to the northwest. Other nearby peaks include Lost Peak,  to the northeast, and Sentinel Peak,  to the southeast. Precipitation runoff from the mountain drains east into headwaters of the Dosewallips River, and west into Hayes River, which is a tributary of the Elwha River. Topographic relief is significant as the summit rises 2,250 feet (685 m) above Dose Meadows in approximately one mile.

History

The mountain was named in 1920 by The Mountaineers to honor Rudo Lorenzo Fromme (1882–1973), a supervisor for Olympic National Forest from 1913 through 1926. Rudo Fromme provided assistance to the club, which was building a trail. This geographical feature's name was officially adopted in 1961 by the U.S. Board on Geographic Names.

Climate

Based on the Köppen climate classification, Mount Fromme is located in the marine west coast climate zone of western North America. Most weather fronts originate in the Pacific Ocean, and travel northeast toward the Olympic Mountains. As fronts approach, they are forced upward by the peaks of the Olympic Range, causing them to drop their moisture in the form of rain or snowfall (Orographic lift). As a result, the Olympics experience high precipitation, especially during the winter months. During winter months, weather is usually cloudy, but due to high pressure systems over the Pacific Ocean that intensify during summer months, there is often little or no cloud cover during the summer. The months June through September offer the most favorable weather for viewing or climbing this peak.

Geology

The Olympic Mountains are composed of obducted clastic wedge material and oceanic crust, primarily Eocene sandstone, turbidite, and basaltic oceanic crust. The mountains were sculpted during the Pleistocene era by erosion and glaciers advancing and retreating multiple times.

See also

 Olympic Mountains
 Geology of the Pacific Northwest

References

External links
 
 Weather forecast: Mount Fromme
 Rudo Lorenzo Fromme:  biography
 Rudo Lorenzo Fromme: biography

Olympic Mountains
Mountains of Washington (state)
Mountains of Jefferson County, Washington
Landforms of Olympic National Park
North American 2000 m summits